York Racecourse is a horse racing venue in York, North Yorkshire, England.
It is the third biggest racecourse in Britain in terms of total prize money offered, and second behind Ascot in prize money offered per meeting. It attracts around 350,000 racegoers per year and stages three of the UK's 36 annual Group 1 races – the Juddmonte International Stakes, the Nunthorpe Stakes and the Yorkshire Oaks.

Location

The course is located in the south-west of the city, next to the former Terry's of York factory, The Chocolate Works.  It is situated on an expanse of ground which has been known since pre-medieval times as the Knavesmire, from the Anglo-Saxon "knave" meaning a man of low standing, and "mire" meaning a swampy pasture for cattle.  For this reason, the racecourse is still sometimes referred to as "The Knavesmire".  The Knavesmire was originally common pasture, belonging to the city.  It was also the scene of the hanging of Dick Turpin in 1739.

History

Racing in York dates back to at least Roman times, with some archaeological evidence suggesting that there may have been equine activities that could have included forms of racing on the site of the Knavesmire as early as neolithic times. The city corporation is known to have given its support to the sport from 1530 and, in 1607, racing is known to have taken place on the frozen River Ouse, between Micklegate Tower and Skeldergate Postern.
A famous yearly race for a golden bell was taking place in the nearby Forest of Galtres in 1590.

There is some uncertainty over when racing first arrived at the current site. The official stance of York Racecourse itself is that racing was first held on the Knavesmire when York's race meeting was moved in 1730 from a previous site at Clifton Ings which was prone to flooding. This is the line taken by the early racing historian, Pick, who maintained that the first race run over the Knavesmire course was the King's Guineas of 1731. There are multiple attestations to this previous racecourse at Clifton Ings, where racing can be traced back at least as far as 1709 and where, in 1714, "such was the concourse of nobility and gentry that attended York races that one hundred and fifty coaches were at one time on the course". The uncertainty lies in the period 1709–1731 and on this, early sources are confusing.

Orton's Turf Annals of York and Doncaster, which records the results of races at this time, has them taking place at "Clifton and Rawcliffe Ings" in the period 1709 and 1731 which would support the official view.  However, Sheahan and Whellan, 19th century York historians, have racing taking place in both places in 1709 – "a regular race meeting on Clifton Ings" and, in the same year, a collection taking place among the citizens to purchase five plates as prizes for a meeting on the Knavesmire.  Drake's Eboracum, another early history, when talking of York's races says, "Clifton-ings was for several years the place of trial; but upon a misunderstanding with the owner of that ground, or great part of it, the race was altered; and Knavesmire, a common pasture belonging to the city, was pitched upon for that purpose." Since, Drake was writing in 1736, it is deemed unlikely that he would write in such a manner if the move to Knavesmire had been so recent.  There is also some slight confusion arising from the running of Royal Cups at nearby Black Hambleton. A Royal Plate was raced for "at York" from 1711, but the Black Hambleton Cup was older still.

The Saunders & Co. History, using all these sources concludes "the races were held annually on both courses – at Clifton Ings previous to and for some years subsequent to the year 1709, and at Knavesmire at and from that date; and that most probably in or about the year 1731, the races were done away with at the former place and transferred to the latter."

What is clear, whenever races were first run on the Knavesmire, is that York was the first centre after Newmarket to formulate a structured race programme, starting in 1751 with the Great Subscription Purses.

The Knavesmire course, as the name suggests, was often very swampy, and in 1776, heavy rains meant that horses had to race for about fifty yards up to their knees in water.

By the 19th century there were two main meetings at York – the Spring Meeting in May and another in August.  These were supplemented by the Yorkshire Union Hunt Meeting in October, and a steeplechase meeting in April. At the August meeting in 1804 Alicia Thornton, who as a result has been called the "first female jockey", took part in a horse race at the racecourse]] at Knavesmire.

At the Peterloo Massacre of 1819, the local military commander General Sir John Byng was absent because he had two horses running at York that day, and delegated command to his deputy, who failed to control the dangerously large crowd.

On 31 May 1982, Pope John Paul II visited York racecourse and drew a reported audience of 190,000.

On 22 September 1984, the racecourse hosted its first music concert headlined by Echo & the Bunnymen.  In recent years, concerts have been arranged after race meetings in June and July and since 2015 it has hosted the Yorfest.

The second day of the 2014 Tour de France started from the racecourse.

Facilities

In 1754, at the instigation of the Marquess of Rockingham the first grandstand was built at a cost of £1,250 by the architect John Carr.  New stands were erected in 1890, incorporating much of the original building.  The late 20th century saw progressive development of the facilities.  A new five-tier grandstand was opened in 1965, the Melrose Stand was opened in 1989 and this was quickly followed by the award-winning Knavesmire Stand, with additional conference facilities in 1996. 2003 saw the opening of the Ebor Stand. The course now has a spectator capacity of 60,000.

Layout

In the 18th century the racecourse was horseshoe in shape and was "judged to be the best race[course] in England for seeing the diversion." In 2005 the track was extended from the end of the home straight to make a full round course, this was to host the 2 m 4 f Gold Cup for the Royal meeting which was moved from Ascot to York that year.  This meant 2 mile races were run on the round course, starting just before the winning post.  The old 2 mile start was discontinued.  The previous layout change occurred in the early 1970s, when to accommodate the York ring road (A64), opened in 1976, the straight course was reduced from 7 furlongs to 6 furlongs and the new 7 furlong chute was built.

Important meetings

York's most important meeting is the Ebor Festival held annually in August.  The feature of this meeting is the Ebor Handicap, one of Europe's premier handicap races.

The Juddmonte International meeting is another significant date in York's racing calendar, home as it is to the Juddmonte International Stakes.  The 2012 renewal of this race, won by Frankel was the second highest rated race of the year in international ratings.

In 2005, York Racecourse acted as a replacement host to the Royal Ascot meeting, due to its usual home at Ascot Racecourse being closed for a £185 million redevelopment, attracting a 5-day attendance of over 224,000.  It also hosted the St Leger in 2006.

York also has its own radio station 'York Raceday Radio' (1602 kHz, medium wave) which can be received up to 10 miles from the course.

Awards

The track won the Racecourse of the Year title in 1997, 2003 and 2017, and came out on top in The Times newspaper survey of all Britain's racecourses.

Records

Attendances
All-time – c. 150,000 (1851) for the Great Match between Voltigeur and The Flying Dutchman
Modern day – 50,510 (Thursday 16 June 2005)

Notable races

References

Bibliography

External links

Official website
Course guide on GG.COM
Course guide on At The Races
Racing on the History of York website
Ebor Festival News Website

 
Sports venues in York
Horse racing venues in England
Sports venues completed in 1731
1731 establishments in England